Shivarovo is a village in Ruen Municipality, in Burgas Province, in southeastern Bulgaria.  It is located at 42.833N and 27.167E with an area of 17.514 km².

References

Villages in Burgas Province